The 2022 RAN Sevens Qualifiers are a North American rugby sevens tournament that took place at the Thomas Robinson Stadium, Nassau on 23 and 24 April 2022; they were held in The Bahamas for the third time. The defending champions from the 2021 event are Jamaica.

Thirteen teams were involved in the tournament, though the United States were notable absentees. Nonetheless, three former winners participated at the event – Jamaica, Guyana, and Canada. Owing to the postponement of the 2022 RAN Super Sevens (originally scheduled to be held in Mexico City during February 2022), this event was created specifically to maintain qualification pathways to the 2022 Rugby World Cup Sevens (top two teams), 2022 World Rugby Sevens Challenger Series and 2022 Commonwealth Games (top team not already qualified via the World Rugby Sevens Series).

Format
The teams are divided into four round-robin pools and each play two matches against their pool opponents (Pool C teams play three matches). The top two sides in each pool advance to the Cup quarter-finals, from which the winners advance to the semi-finals (and final / third-place matches beyond those), while the losing quarter-finalists contest the Plate semi-finals and finals for fifth to eighth place.

The remaining teams that did not qualify for the Cup rounds compete in a Shield round-robin pool for ninth to thirteenth place.

Teams 
The thirteen teams competing in the Bahamas were:

Pool stage
The final pool arrangements were announced on 22 April.

All times in Eastern Daylight Time (UTC−04:00)

Pool A

Pool B

Pool C

Pool D

Knockout stage

Shield competition (9th–13th place round-robin)
{| class="wikitable collapsible collapsed" style="width:100%;"
|-
!Matches
|-
|

|}

Plate competition (5th–8th place playoffs)

Cup competition

Final standings

Note

See also
 2021–22 World Rugby Sevens Series

References

External links
 Tournament site

 

2022
Rugby union in the Bahamas
2022 rugby sevens competitions
April 2022 sports events in North America